Yelena Tikhanina (born 27 May 1977) is a Russian short track speed skater. She competed at the 1994 Winter Olympics and the 1998 Winter Olympics.

References

External links

1977 births
Living people
Sportspeople from Saint Petersburg
Russian female short track speed skaters
Olympic short track speed skaters of Russia
Short track speed skaters at the 1994 Winter Olympics
Short track speed skaters at the 1998 Winter Olympics
Universiade medalists in short track speed skating
Universiade bronze medalists for Russia
Competitors at the 1997 Winter Universiade
20th-century Russian women